Albion Congregational Church was built on Stamford Street East in Ashton-Under-Lyne by John Brooke between 1890 and 95. It is a Grade II listed building.

Organ
An organ was installed by Charles Lloyd (presumably in 1904/5). It was rebuilt by Rushworth and Dreaper in 1953. A specification of the organ can be found on the National Pipe Organ Register and on Jonathan Scott's concert pages.

References

Churches completed in 1895
Congregational churches in Nottingham